The Communauté d'agglomération Melun Val de Seine is  a communauté d'agglomération in the Seine-et-Marne département and in the Île-de-France région of France, centred on the city of Melun. Its area is 153.2 km2. Its population was 131,924 in 2018, of which 39,947 in Melun proper.

Composition 
Since 1 January 2017, the Communauté d'agglomération Melun Val de Seine includes 20 communes:

Boissettes
Boissise-la-Bertrand
Boissise-le-Roi
Dammarie-lès-Lys
La Rochette
Le Mée-sur-Seine
Limoges-Fourches
Lissy
Livry-sur-Seine
Maincy
Melun
Montereau-sur-le-Jard
Pringy
Rubelles
Saint-Fargeau-Ponthierry
Saint-Germain-Laxis
Seine-Port
Vaux-le-Pénil
Villiers-en-Bière
Voisenon

See also
Communes of the Seine-et-Marne department

References

Intercommunalities of Seine-et-Marne
Agglomeration communities in France